Basketball at the 1995 Southeast Asian Games was held from 10 to 16 October 1997 in Chiang Mai, Thailand. This edition featured both tournaments for men's and women's team. All matches were held in 700th Anniversary Sport Complex Gymnasium 2.

The  were able to defend their title by defeating the hosts  in their third consecutive Finals match-up, 108–89, for their third consecutive title since 1991 and their ninth overall title. Meanwhile,  snatched the bronze from the last edition's bronze medallists  in the battle for third place.

In the women's event,  notched their fifth consecutive championship by defeating last edition's bronze medallists  in their first ever championship match, 91–53. Meanwhile, the last edition's runners-up , managed to salvage the bronze medal by subduing  in the battle for third place.

Tournament format
The competition format for both men's and women's event calls for the top two teams after the single round robin to face in the championship match.

Men's tournament

Participating nations

Results

Bronze medal match

Gold medal match

Women's tournament

Participating nations

Results

Bronze medal match

Gold medal match

References

1995
1995 Southeast Asian Games events
1995–96 in Asian basketball
International basketball competitions hosted by Thailand